Richard Eric Susskind OBE FRSE (born 28 March 1961) is a British author, speaker, and independent adviser to international professional firms and national governments. He is the IT adviser to the Lord Chief Justice of England and Wales, holds professorships at the University of Oxford, Gresham College and Strathclyde University, is a past chair of the Advisory Panel on Public Sector Information, and is the president of the Society for Computers and Law. 

Susskind has specialised in legal technology since the early 1980s, has authored nine books and is a regular columnist at The Times. Susskind has more recently furthered his research to cover the professions more generally and his latest book, co-authored with Daniel Susskind, his son, predicts the decline of today's professions and describes the people and systems that will replace them. They argue that the current professions are antiquated and no longer affordable and explain how 'increasingly capable systems' will fundamentally change the way that professional expertise is shared. They propose six models for producing and distributing expertise in society.

Early life and education
The son of Dr Werner Susskind and Shirley Susskind, he was educated at the University of Glasgow and took his doctorate from Balliol College, Oxford.

Online dispute resolution 
Susskind chairs the UK Civil Justice Council's Advisory Group for online dispute resolution, which published a report in February 2015 recommending the establishment of Her Majesty's Online Courts (HMOC). The report recommends HMOC consist of three tiers: online evaluation, online facilitation and online judges. According to the report, the benefits of HMOC would be an increase in access to justice and substantial savings in the cost of the court system.

Honours
1992 – Honorary member, Society for Computers and Law
2000 – OBE, for services to IT in the Law and to the Administration of Justice
2001 – Honorary fellow of law faculty, Durham University
2005 – Honorary professor, Gresham College, London

Fellowships
1992 – Fellow, Royal Society of Arts
1997 – Fellow, Royal Society of Edinburgh
1997 – Fellow, the British Computer Society

Family
In 1985, Susskind married Michelle Latter. They have three children: Daniel, Jamie and Alexandra. Daniel Susskind, his co-author of The Future of the Professions, is an economics lecturer at Balliol College, Oxford; Jamie Susskind is a barrister and the author of Future Politics, which also examines the future of technology.

Books 
 Expert Systems in Law (Oxford University Press, 1987; paperback, 1989)
 Latent Damage Law – The Expert System (Butterworths, 1988) (with P.N. Capper)
 Essays on Law and Artificial Intelligence (Tano, 1993)
 The Future of Law (Oxford University Press, 1996; revised paperback, 1998)
 Transforming the Law (Oxford University Press, 2000; revised paperback, 2003)
 The Susskind Interviews (Sweet & Maxwell, 2005)
 The End of Lawyers? (Oxford University Press, 2008; revised paperback, 2010)
 Tomorrow's Lawyers: An Introduction to Your Future (Oxford University Press, paperback 2013)
 The Future of the Professions: How Technology Will Transform the Work of Human Experts (Oxford University Press, 2015) (with D. Susskind)
 Online Courts and the Future of Justice (Oxford University Press, 2019)

References

External links 
 

1961 births
Living people
Writers from Paisley, Renfrewshire
Alumni of Balliol College, Oxford
Alumni of the University of Glasgow
Academics of the University of Oxford
Academics of the University of Strathclyde
British legal scholars
British lawyers
Professors of Gresham College
British consultants
Philosophers of law
Fellows of the British Computer Society
Fellows of the Royal Society of Edinburgh
Officers of the Order of the British Empire